Brescia–Edolo railway is a railway line in Lombardy, Italy.

History 
The line Brescia–Iseo was opened on 21 June 1885.

In 1909 it was extended to Edolo.

A link between Iseo and Rovato Borgo, served by the line R9 of Trenord, was suspended in 2018.

See also 
 List of railway lines in Italy

References 

 Trenord timetable

External links 

Railway lines in Lombardy
Railway lines opened in 1909
1909 establishments in Italy
Brescia